The Ladue School District is a public school district in Ladue, Missouri, with four elementary, one middle, and one high school, with a special Fifth Grade Center. The district serves 4,180 total students, and employs 280 full-time classroom teachers. The total operating revenue is $49.9 mil. with $50.2 mil. operating expenses. Ladue spends $11,903 per student, and pays an average of $62,697 per teacher ($41,000-$101,542). According to Newsweek (June 19, 2011 issue), Ladue ranks in the top 2% of public schools in the nation. It serves an area encompassing 19 sq. mi. with more than 27,000 residents. It includes all or part of 10 communities including Ladue, Creve Coeur, Crystal Lake Park, Frontenac, Huntleigh, Olivette, Richmond Heights, Town and Country, Unincorporated St. Louis County, and Westwood.

History

As the City of Ladue was incorporated in 1936, Spoede Elementary and Ross Elementary were built in the 1930s. The Ladue School District was first organized in 1939.

In U.S. v Ladue School District, a case the U.S. Department of Justice brought in 1978, the federal government charged Ladue with discrimination in hiring of faculty and staff. In 1999, Ladue exited the Voluntary Interdistrict Choice Corporation (VICC), a city-county school desegregation program.

Ladue High School

Ladue High School had 1,306 students in the 2013–14 school year. Ladue High School has a 99% graduation rate, of which 92% continue on to higher education in 2-4 year institutions. In standardized testing, Ladue scores above both the state and national average. Newsweek in 2013, ranked the public school 166th best in the nation (up from 188th in 2011-12), and first in Missouri (up from fourth).

Administration
 Superintendent: Dr. Jim Wipke
 Principal: Brad Griffith (effective July 1, 2013)

Ladue Middle School

Originally called "East Ladue Junior High School," Ladue Middle School teaches children from sixth through eighth grades, total of 976 students in 2013–14. In May 2014 it was named National School of Character.

Ladue Fifth Grade Center 
Built on property bought by the district in 1959 and used as a secondary middle school until 1980, when it was sold to the Westminster Christian Academy. In 2010, the property was re-purchased by the district to construct the Fifth Grade Center. Construction ended in time for its first semester in Fall 2013. In the 2015–2016 school year, there were 342 students enrolled.

Elementary schools
All four Ladue Elementary Schools teach children in kindergarten through fourth grades.

Conway Elementary 
Conway Elementary is located in Ladue, MO, at 9900 Conway Road. In 2013–14 Conway Elementary had 339 students. This school has the smallest number of students throughout the district. Conway enrolled its first black students in 1965; those students were subjected to racial slurs by several other children.

Old Bonhomme Elementary 
Old Bonhomme School is an elementary school in Olivette, Missouri, with a total of 383 students in 2013–14.

Reed Elementary 

Located in the middle of Ladue near the intersection of Ladue Road and McKnight Road, with a total of 421 students in 2013–14.

Spoede Elementary 
Spoede Elementary is located in Creve Coeur, on the west side of Spoede Road, with a total of 430 students in 2013–14. This school's mascot is a turtle.

References

External links
Ladue Schools
Ladue High School
Ladue School District
Ladue High School Alumni Association
Ladue Schools - Overview
2012 Ladue Schools Annual Report

School districts in Missouri
Education in St. Louis County, Missouri
School districts established in 1939